The disposition effect is an anomaly discovered in behavioral finance. It relates to the tendency of investors to sell assets that have increased in value, while keeping assets that have dropped in value.

Hersh Shefrin and Meir Statman identified and named the effect in their 1985 paper, which found that people dislike losing significantly more than they enjoy winning. The disposition effect has been described as one of the foremost vigorous actualities around individual investors because investors will hold stocks that have lost value yet sell stocks that have gained value."

In 1979, Daniel Kahneman and Amos Tversky traced the cause of the disposition effect to the so-called "prospect theory". The prospect theory proposes that when an individual is presented with two equal choices, one having possible gains and the other with possible losses, the individual is more likely to opt for the former choice even though both would yield the same economic result.

The disposition effect can be minimized by a mental approach called "hedonic framing".

Overview
Nicholas Barberis and Wei Xiong have depicted the disposition impact as the trade of individual investors are one of the most important realities. The influence, they note, has been recorded in all the broad individual investor trading activity databases available and has been linked to significant pricing phenomena such as post-earnings announcement drift and momentum at the stock level. In other conditions, for example in the real estate market, disposition effects were also discovered.

Barberis has noted that the disposition effect is not a rational sort of conduct because of the reality of stock market momentum, meaning stocks that have performed well in the past six months appear to perform well in the next six months, and stocks that have done badly in the past six months tend to do poorly in the next six months. This being the case, the rational act would be to hold on to stocks which have recently increased in value; and to sell stocks which have recently decreased in value. However, individual investors tend to do just the contrary.

Alexander Joshi has summed up the disposition effect as the disposition that investors have to hold on to losing positions longer than winning positions, saying that investors would illustrate risk-seeking conduct by retaining the losers because they dislike losses and fear preventing them. Alternatively, investors will want to lock in money, so that they display risk-averse conduct by selling winners.

Dacey and Zielonka showed that the greater the level of stock prices volatility, the more prone the investor was to sell a loser, contrary to the disposition effect. This result explains the panic selling of stocks during a market collapse.

Shefrin and Statman study

The effect was identified and named by Hersh Shefrin and Meir Statman in 1985. In their study, Shefrin and Statman noted that individuals do not like causing losses any more than they like making benefits, and individuals are able to gamble on losses. Consequently, investors will be energetic to sell stocks that have risen in value but holding onto stocks that have decreased value. The researchers coined the term "disposition effect" to describe this tendency of holding on to losing stocks too long and to sell off well-performing stocks too readily. Shefrin colloquially described this as a "predisposition toward get-evenitis." John R. Nofsinger has called this sort of investment behavior as a product of the desire to avoid regret and seek pride.

Prospect theory
Researchers have traced the cause of the disposition effect to so-called "prospect theory", which was first identified and named by Daniel Kahneman and Amos Tversky in 1979. Kahneman and Tversky stated that losses generate more emotional feelings which affect individual than the effects of an equivalent amount of gains. and that people consequently base their decisions not on perceived losses but on perceived gains. What this means is that, if presented with two equal choices, one described in terms of possible gains and the other described in terms of possible losses, they would opt for the former choice, even though both would yield the same economic end result. For example, even though the net result of receiving $50 would be the same as the net result of gaining $100 and then losing $50, people would tend to take a more favorable view of the former than of the latter scenario.

In Kahneman and Tversky's study, participants were presented with two situations. In the first, they had $1,000 and had to select one of two choices. Under Choice A, they would have a 50% chance of gaining $1,000, and a 50% chance of gaining $0; under Choice B, they would have a 100% chance of gaining $500. In the second situation, they had $2,000 and had to select either Choice A (a 50% chance of losing $1,000, and 50% of losing $0) or Choice B (a 100% chance of losing $500). An overwhelming majority of participants chose “B” in the first scenario and "A" in the second. This suggested that people are willing to settle for an acceptable amount of earnings (despite they have a reasonable opportunity of gaining more). However, people are willing to participate in risk-seeking activities where they can reduce their losses. In a sense, people value losses more than the same amount of gains. This phenomenon is called the “asymmetric value function," which means, in short, the pain of loss outweighs the equivalent level of gain.

The prospect theory can explain such phenomena as people who prefer not to deposit their money in a bank, even though they would earn interest, or people who choose not to work overtime because they would have to pay higher taxes. It also plainly underlies the disposition effect. In both situations presented to participants in Kahneman and Tversky's study, the participants sought, in risk-averse fashion, to cash in on guaranteed gains. This behavior plainly explains why investors act too soon to realize stockmarket gains.

Avoiding the disposition effect
The disposition effect can be minimized by means of a mental approach called "hedonic framing". For example, individuals can try to force themselves to think of a single large gain as a number of smaller gains, to think of a number of smaller losses as a single large loss, to think of the combination of a major gain and a minor loss as a net minor gain, and, in the case of a combined major loss and minor gain, to think of the two separately. In a similar manner, investors show a reversed disposition effect when they are framed to think of their investment as progress towards a specific investment goal rather than a generic investment.

See also
 Cognitive dissonance
 Endowment effect
 Escalation of commitment
 Loss aversion
 Status quo bias

References

External links
A list of published papers on the topic

Behavioral finance
Decision-making paradoxes
Cognitive biases